1,5-Diaza-3,7-diphosphacyclooctanes are organophosphorus compounds with the formula [R'NCHP(R)CH], often abbreviated PN.  They are air-sensitive white solids that are soluble in organic solvents.  The ligands exist as meso and d,l-diastereomers, but only the meso forms function as bidentate ligands.

Some metal-PN complexes catalyze the hydrogen evolution reaction as well as the oxidation of hydrogen (H).  The catalytic mechanism involves the interaction of substrate with the amines in the second coordination sphere.

Synthesis and reactions
The ligands are prepared by the condensation of a primary phosphine, formaldehyde, and a primary amine:
2 RPH  +  4 CHO  +  2 RNH  →   [RNCHP(R')CH]  +  4 HO

Diazadiphosphacyclooctanes function as chelating diphosphine ligands.  Typical nickel complexes contain two such ligands are give the formula [Ni(PN)].

Cationic complexes of these PN and related ligands often exhibit enhanced reactivity toward H.  These complexes serve as electrocatalysts for H production.

Related ligands
Azadiphosphacycloheptanes are a related family of diphosphines, but containing only one amine.  They are prepared by condensation of 1,2-bis(phenylphosphino)ethane, formaldehyde, and a primary amine.  From the meso-isomer, typical nickel complexes contain two such ligands, i.e. [Ni(PNR')].  When bound to metals, these ligands adopt a conformation similar to that of 1,4-diazacycloheptanes.  Acyclic phosphine-amine ligands have the formula (RPCH)NR'.

References

Chelating agents
Diphosphines
Phosphorus heterocycles